A breakup song is a song describing the breakup of an intimate relationship. 

Breakup Song may also refer to:

Breakup Song (album), a 2012 album by Deerhoof
"Break Up Song" (Little Mix song), a 2020 song by Little Mix
"The Breakup Song (They Don't Write 'Em)", a 1981 song by Greg Kihn
"The Breakup Song" (Francesca Battistelli song), a 2018 song by Francesca Battistelli

See also
"Potential Breakup Song", a 2006 song by Aly & AJ